Mount Olive is a census-designated place in Shenandoah County, in the U.S. state of Virginia.

References

External links
 Mount Olive (in Shenandoah County, VA) Populated Place Profile

Census-designated places in Shenandoah County, Virginia
Census-designated places in Virginia